Bwlch y Ddwyallt is the name commonly applied to the high point of the plateau of Gwaun Cerrig Llwydion in the eastern part of the Brecon Beacons in south Wales. It is a top of Waun Rydd.

The plateau reaches its highest point of 754m above sea level on its northern rim overlooking the head of Cwm Cwareli. The name is an odd one to apply to a peak since the Welsh word 'bwlch' generally signifies a col or pass between mountains.

Geology
The plateau is formed from the hard-wearing sandstones of the Plateau Beds Formation of the Old Red Sandstone laid down during the Devonian period. These beds directly overlie the sandstones of the Brownstones Formation, also of Devonian age, which form the bulk of the hill. The cliffs below Bwlch y Ddwyallt shows signs of having been glaciated during the ice ages as do those beneath Graig Fan Las on the eastern edge of the plateau.

Access
The entire area is classed as open country. The Beacons Way runs along the southern edge of the plateau.  Other footpaths skirt the remaining rims of the plateau and connect with neighbouring peaks.

External links
Images of Bwlch y Ddwyallt and surrounding area on the Geograph website

References

Nuttalls
Brecon Beacons
Mountains and hills of Powys